Island Days is a tower defense visual novel video game developed by Klon in collaboration with 0verflow for the Nintendo 3DS. It is a spin-off of 0verflow's School Days visual novel series, and was released in Japan on July 3, 2014. The opening theme is "Paradise (Past Plus Parallel)" by Kyōko Aihara.

Plot

The story follows Makoto Itou, with his various female companions, who find themselves stranded on a remote island. While awaiting rescue, Makoto and the others must do their best to survive on the island.

Gameplay
The game is split into two main parts, story and battle. The story part follows a typical visual novel structure, in which the protagonist, Makoto, interacts with the various female characters and builds relationships with them. The battle part is a tower defense game, in which Makoto and the girls must protect their food supply from wild animals. As characters lose health while participating in battles, players should be careful to manage who accompanies Makoto into battles. As per many visual novels, the plot can take various courses based on the player's actions, such as who Makoto romantically pursues, or potential deaths among the characters.

References

External links
Official website 

2014 video games
Days series
Nintendo 3DS games
Nintendo 3DS eShop games
Nintendo 3DS-only games
Tower defense video games
Video games developed in Japan
Video games set on islands
Visual novels
Japan-exclusive video games